Dmitry Savitski (Łacinka: Dmitryj Savicki; born ) is a Belarusian male artistic gymnast. He competed at the 2008 Summer Olympics in Beijing and at multiple world championships, including the 2010 World Artistic Gymnastics Championships in Rotterdam, Netherlands.

References

1984 births
Living people
Belarusian male artistic gymnasts
Place of birth missing (living people)
Gymnasts at the 2008 Summer Olympics
Olympic gymnasts of Belarus
21st-century Belarusian people